Duhan van der Merwe (born ) is a South African rugby union player, who plays as a wing for Edinburgh Rugby and for the Scotland national rugby union team.

Schoolboy rugby
Van der Merwe was born and grew up in George in the Western Cape province of South Africa. In 2011, he represented SWD at the Under-16 Grant Khomo Week held in Queenstown, appearing in all three matches and scoring a try in their 25–8 victory over KwaZulu-Natal.

The following year, he played for SWD at the premier schoolboy rugby tournament in South Africa, the Under-18 Craven Week. He was named in the South Africa Schools team at the conclusion of the tournament, and made two starts for them in the Under-18 International Series, helping them to victories over France and England.

Still eligible for the Under-18s in 2013, Van der Merwe again played in all three of SWD's matches at the Craven Week held in Polokwane. He scored three tries – two against Eastern Province and one in a victory over the  – and was again included in the South African Schools team. He scored a try in their 19–14 victory over England in their first match of the 2013 Under-18 International Series, and followed that up with two tries in their next match against France. He didn't score in their final match against Wales, but still finished as the top try scorer in the competition.

He also played rugby sevens, where he represented South Africa.

Professional rugby

2014–2016 : Youth rugby

After high school, Van der Merwe moved to Pretoria, where he joined the ' academy for the 2014 season. Shortly after joining, he was a late call-up to the South Africa Under-20 squad that participated at the 2014 IRB Junior World Championship in New Zealand, replacing Rohan Janse van Rensburg who picked up an injury in South Africa's 61–5 victory against Scotland in the opening round in Pool C. Van der Merwe was an unused replacement for their 33–24 victory over hosts New Zealand in their second match, but started their final pool match, a 21–8 victory over Samoa to help the team finish top of their pool to progress to the semi-finals. He didn't feature in their 32–25 win over New Zealand at that stage, but was named on the bench for the final against England and came on as a replacement in the second half, with South Africa losing 20–21 to finish as runners-up in the competition.

He returned to domestic action to play for the  team in the 2014 Under-19 Provincial Championship. He made twelve starts in the competition and scored a total of eight tries, the second-highest by a Blue Bulls player and joint-third overall in Group A of the competition. Another try in their second meeting against Western Province was followed by a hat-trick in a 46–24 victory over the Leopards in Potchefstroom. The helped his side finish top of the log and make it all the way to the final of the competition before losing to Western Province.

He had an operation at the start of 2015, which ruled him out of action for the majority of the season, also ruling him out of contention with a second consecutive Under 20 Championship.

In their final match of the regular season against bottom team , Van der Merwe scored six of his side's eleven tries in a 100–25 victory. With bonus points in effect for scoring tries that originated outside the final 22, Van der Merwe's point haul in the match was a massive 48 points and he finished the competition as the top try scorer and the fourth-highest points scorer.

2016–2017 : Montpellier

He moved to France in July 2016 to join Top 14 side , signing a youth contract with the team. He made his debut for the senior team in their Round 15 match against , replacing Joffrey Michel. A recurring hip injury, and difficulties adjusting to the culture and language, meant he gained little game time.

2017–2021 : Edinburgh

Van der Merwe signed a two-year professional contract with Scottish Pro14 side Edinburgh ahead of the 2017-18 season. He failed his medical due to a long-standing hip injury, but Edinburgh head coach Richard Cockerill signed him despite this. The injury meant he missed half his first season. However, his impact thereafter was strong. One area of improvement was seeking to get more involved in the game, from his wing position.

2021–2022: Worcester Warriors
On 4 January 2021, it was announced that van der Merwe would move to England to sign for Worcester Warriors in the Premiership Rugby competition ahead of the 2021-22 season on a long-term deal. Due to the club entering administration all Warriors players had their contracts terminated on 5 October 2022.

2022–: Return to Edinburgh
Only hours after having his contract terminated at Worcester Warriors it was confirmed that van der Merwe would return to Edinburgh on a long-term deal.

International

Scotland
He made his international debut for Scotland against Georgia on 23 October 2020, scoring a try in the process. He had recently qualified for Scotland by three years of residency during his time at Edinburgh.

He doubled his test try-scoring tally on 14 November, touching down one of Scotland's four tries in Florence during victory over Italy. then adding another in Dublin on 5 December.

Van Der Merwe scored the decisive try in Scotland's victory over England in the opening match of the 2021 Six Nations Championship. The following month he scored a further two tries against Italy in a 52-10 victory. This was followed by another brace in the final match of the championship in Paris, the second coming in 84th minute of play to secure a dramatic last-gasp win, Scotland's first in France since 1999. This brought his tally to eight tries in his first ten test matches.

International tries

British & Irish Lions
In May 2021, Van Der Merwe was selected in the 37-man squad for the British and Irish Lions tour of South Africa.

He took to the field in the opening warmup match against Japan at Murrayfield, scoring a try in the process and becoming Lion #841. After performing well in the tour's warm up games, scoring five tries in four appearances, he was selected in the starting line up for the first Test and played 70 minutes as the Lions won 17-22. He subsequently played the full 80 minutes of both the second and third Tests as well.

Personal life

Van der Merwe is the younger brother of Akker van der Merwe, also a professional rugby union player who plays at hooker.

Responding to unverified claims, Duhan confirmed that he was not named after Irish folk musician Johnny Duhan and his brother Akker was not named after clarinetist Acker Bilk.

References

External links

 

1995 births
Blue Bulls players
Expatriate rugby union players in France
Living people
Montpellier Hérault Rugby players
Rugby union wings
Scotland international rugby union players
South African expatriate rugby union players
South African expatriate sportspeople in France
South African rugby union players
South Africa Under-20 international rugby union players
Rugby union players from Pretoria
University of Pretoria alumni
Edinburgh Rugby players
Worcester Warriors players
British & Irish Lions rugby union players from South Africa
British & Irish Lions rugby union players from Scotland
Rugby union players from the Western Cape
Naturalised citizens of the United Kingdom
Expatriate rugby union players in Scotland
South African expatriate sportspeople in Scotland